Michaël Lorenzo-Vera (born 28 January 1985) is a French professional golfer.

Career
Lorenzo-Vera was born in Bayonne, Pyrénées-Atlantiques in South-West France.

After turning professional in 2005, Lorenzo-Vera played on the Alps Tour, one of Europe's third tier development tours. In 2006, he won the Open International de la Mirabelle D’or, a tournament he had also won the year before as an amateur, on his way to 4th on the Order of Merit, which gave him a place on the Challenge Tour for the following season.

On Europe's second-tier tour in 2007, Lorenzo-Vera had recorded eight top-ten finishes going into the last event, the Apulia San Domenico Grand Final, and was 7th on the Challenge Tour's money list. He set a course record in the first round and went on to win the tournament, which catapulted him to the top of the end of season Challenge Tour Rankings and guaranteed his card on the top level European Tour for 2008.

The highlight of Lorenzo-Vera's first season on the European Tour was finishing as joint runner-up at the Volvo China Open, having led at half way. He ended the year ranked just outside the top 100 on the Order of Merit, but had done enough to retain his place on the tour.

Professional wins (7)

Challenge Tour wins (1)

Challenge Tour playoff record (0–1)

Alps Tour wins (4)

French Tour wins (1)

Other wins (1)
2006 Open des Landes (France Pro Golf Tour)

Playoff record
European Tour playoff record (0–1)

Results in major championships
Results not in chronological order in 2020.

CUT = missed the half-way cut
"T" = tied
NT = No tournament due to COVID-19 pandemic

Results in World Golf Championships

1Cancelled due to COVID-19 pandemic

"T" = Tied
NT = No tournament

Team appearances
Amateur
European Boys' Team Championship (representing France): 2002, 2003
Jacques Léglise Trophy (representing Continental Europe): 2002, 2003
European Amateur Team Championship (representing France): 2005

Professional
World Cup (representing France): 2018

See also
2007 Challenge Tour graduates
2014 Challenge Tour graduates
2022 European Tour Qualifying School graduates

References

External links
 

French male golfers
European Tour golfers
Sportspeople from Bayonne
Sportspeople from Biarritz
French people of Spanish descent
1985 births
Living people